Kabombo Airport  was an airstrip that served Kabombo in Tanganyika Province, Democratic Republic of the Congo. The  dirt runway is overgrown with shrubs and some large trees. Closure date is unknown.

References

External links
 
 HERE Maps - Kabombo
 OpenStreetMap - Kabombo airstrip

Defunct airports
Airports in Tanganyika Province